Fu Bai Fu is an Indian Marathi-language comedy show that aired on Zee Marathi from 2010 to 2014.

Concept 
Marathi TV Show where daily soap stars perform stand-up comedy. These soap actors perform stand-up comedy along with their appoint comedian partners on stage.

Seasons summary

Cast 
 Anand Ingale
 Anand Abhyankar
 Aditi Sarangdhar
 Bhalchandra Kadam
 Vaibhav Mangle
 Supriya Pathare
 Ashwini Ekbote
 Sudesh Mhashilkar
 Surekha Kudchi
 Ajinkya Joshi
 Aarti Wadabgalkar
 Aarti Solanki
 Bharat Ganeshpure
 Sagar Karande
 Kushal Badrike
 Girish Oak
 Shreya Bugade
 Sharvari Patankar
 Sunil Tawde
 Shashikant Kerkar
 Sankarshan Karhade
 Priyadarshan Jadhav
 Vishakha Subhedar
 Vikas Samudre
 Namrata Sambherao
 Neha Shitole
 Digamber Naik
 Prajakta Hanamghar
 Ajay Jadhav
 Leena Bhagwat
 Madhvi Juvekar
 Kishori Ambiye
 Kishori Godbole
 Satish Tare
 Kshitee Jog
 Santosh Mayekar
 Priya Arun
 Bhargavi Chirmule
 Bhaktee Desai
 Santosh Pawar
 Hemangi Kavi
 Atul Todankar
 Snehlata Tawde-Vasaikar
 Atisha Naik
 Mangesh Desai
 Sharmishtha Raut
 Anshuman Vichare

Judges 
 Nirmiti Sawant
 Renuka Shahane
 Swapnil Joshi
 Ashwini Kalsekar
 Sanjay Jadhav
 Smita Talwalkar
 Jitendra Joshi
 Mahesh Kothare
 Umesh Kamat

Awards

Season 1
Host
 Nilesh Sable

Judges
 Nirmiti Sawant
 Swapnil Joshi
 Smita Talwalkar

Contestants
 Vaibhav Mangle
 Vishakha Subhedar
 Aarti Solanki
 Anand Abhyankar
 Surekha Kudachi
 Ajinkya Joshi
 Digambar Naik
 Girish Oak
 Sharvari Patankar
 Sunil Tawde
 Vikas Samudre
 Neha Shitole
 Namrata Awate-Sambherao
 Satish Tare
 Bhaktee Desai
 Santosh Pawar

Season 2

Host
 Nilesh Sable
 Sai Tamhankar

Judges
 Nirmiti Sawant
 Swapnil Joshi

Contestants
 Anshuman Vichare and Atul Todankar - (Winner) 
 Kishori Ambiye - Anand Ingale
 Sagar Karande - Sunil Tawde
 Vikas Samudre - Aarti Solanki
 Vaibhav Mangle - Kshitee Jog
 Supriya Pathare - Purnima
 Anand Ingale - Digambar Naik

Season 3

Host
 Nilesh Sable

Judges
 Nirmiti Sawant
 Renuka Shahane

Contestants
 Kishori Ambiye - Santosh Pawar - (Winner) 
 Bhau Kadam - Satish Tare
 Kushal Badrike - Hemangi Kavi
 Bhargavi Chirmule - Mangesh Desai
 Santosh Mayekar - Priya Arun
 Atul Todankar- Snehlata Vasaikar
 Sunil Tawde- Atisha Naik

Special appearance
 Vaibhav Mangle - Anand Ingale

Season 4

Host
 Nilesh Sable

Judges
 Mahesh Kothare
 Swapnil Joshi

Contestants
 Vijay Patwardhan - Satish Tare - (Winner) 
 Digambar Naik - Hemangi Kavi
 Anand Abhyankar -
 Kushal Badrike - Purnima
 Amita Khopkar - Jaywant
 Anand Ingale - Supriya Pathare

Season 6 - Comedycha Aadharcard

Host
 Nilesh Sable

Judges
 Ashwini Kalsekar
 Swapnil Joshi

Contestants
 Bhau Kadam - (Winner) 
 Supriya Pathare - (Winner) 
 Leena Bhagwat
 Hrishikesh Joshi
 Kushal Badrike
 Santosh Pawar
 Vijay Patwardhan
 Priyadarshan Jadhav
 Kshitee Jog
 Sharmishtha Raut
 Hemangi Kavi
 Rajan Bhise

Special appearance
 Mohan Joshi

Season 7 - Toll Free Comedy

Host
 Nilesh Sable

Judges
 Ashwini Kalsekar
 Swapnil Joshi

Contestants
 Bharat Ganeshpure - (Winner) 
 Sagar Karande - (Winner) 
 Bhau Kadam
 Supriya Pathare
 Vijay Patwardhan
 Madhavi Juvekar
 Sunil Tawde
 Priyadarshan Jadhav
 Anshuman Vichare
 Atul Todankar
 Hemant Dhome
 Sudesh Mhashilkar
 Avinash Narkar

Season 8 - Naya Hain Yaha

Host
 Nilesh Sable

Judges
 Ashwini Kalsekar
 Sanjay Jadhav

Contestants
 Bharat Ganeshpure - Sagar Karande - (Winner) 
 Anand Ingale - Vaibhav Mangle
 Bhau Kadam – Supriya Pathare
 Sudesh Mhashilkar - Surekha Kudachi
 Ajinkya Joshi – Aarti Wadagbalkar
 Sunil Tawade - Shashikant Kerkar
 Sankarshan Karhade- Shreya Bugade
 Priyadarshan Jadhav - Vishakha Subhedar

Season 9 - Jithe Asal, Tithe Hasal

Host
 Vaidehi Parashurami

Judges
 Nirmiti Sawant
 Umesh Kamat

Contestants
 Onkar Bhojane
 Sagar Karande
 Pandharinath Kamble
 Kamlakar Satpute
 Ashish Pawar
 Madhavi Juvekar
 Neha Khan
 Sneha Majgaonkar
 Pranav Raorane
 Shashikant Kerkar
 Nandkishor Choughule

References

External links

ZEE5
 Fu Bai Fu season 3
 Fu Bai Fu season 4
 Fu Bai Fu season 6
 Fu Bai Fu season 7

Indian reality television series
Indian stand-up comedy television series
2010 Indian television series debuts
Zee Marathi original programming
Marathi-language television shows
2014 Indian television series endings